HMS LST-408 was a United States Navy  that was transferred to the Royal Navy during World War II. As with many of her class, the ship was never named. Instead, she was referred to by her hull designation.

Construction
LST-408 was laid down on 9 September 1942, under Maritime Commission (MARCOM) contract, MC hull 928, by the Bethlehem-Fairfield Shipyard, Baltimore, Maryland; launched 31 October 1942; then transferred to the United Kingdom and commissioned on 23 December 1942.

Service history 
LST-408 saw no active service in the United States Navy. The tank landing ship was decommissioned and returned to United States Navy custody on 4 May 1946, and struck from the Navy list on 19 June 1946. On 5 December 1947, LST-408 was sold to Bosey, Philippines, and subsequently scrapped.

See also 
 List of United States Navy LSTs

Notes 

Citations

Bibliography 

Online resources

External links

 

Ships built in Baltimore
1942 ships
LST-1-class tank landing ships of the Royal Navy
World War II amphibious warfare vessels of the United Kingdom
S3-M2-K2 ships